Clement Chukwu (born 7 July 1973) is a former Nigerian athlete who specialized in the 200 and 400 metres.

Academics
Chukwu attended Eastern Michigan University where he received his Bachelor of Arts in Urban and Regional Planning, minoring in Geography, and a Master of Science degree in Geographical Information Systems.  He is currently the Planning Director for the City of Pickerington, Ohio, a suburb southeast of Columbus.

Track and Field
After being banned from 1992 to 1996 for a positive drug test he reemerged at the 1996 Olympics over 400 metres, being knocked out in the quarter finals. He later  won gold medals in this event at the 1997 Universiade and the 1998 African Championships, and a silver medal at the 1999 All-Africa Games. At the 2000 Olympics he was a part of the Nigerian team that won the silver medal in the 4 x 400 metres relay, which was later elevated to gold after the USA team was stripped of the gold medal.

His personal bests are:  200 meters Outdoor is 20:30 in 1998; 200 meters Indoor 20:78; 400 meters Outdoor 44.65; 400 meters Indoor

He was inducted into the Eastern Michigan Hall of Fame in 2011.

See also
 List of sportspeople sanctioned for doping offences

External links
 
 

1973 births
Living people
Nigerian male sprinters
Eastern Michigan University alumni
Nigerian sportspeople in doping cases
Athletes (track and field) at the 1996 Summer Olympics
Athletes (track and field) at the 2000 Summer Olympics
Athletes (track and field) at the 2004 Summer Olympics
Olympic athletes of Nigeria
Olympic gold medalists for Nigeria
Doping cases in athletics
Place of birth missing (living people)
Eastern Michigan Eagles men's track and field athletes
Medalists at the 2000 Summer Olympics
Olympic gold medalists in athletics (track and field)
African Games silver medalists for Nigeria
African Games medalists in athletics (track and field)
Universiade medalists in athletics (track and field)
Athletes (track and field) at the 1999 All-Africa Games
Universiade gold medalists for Nigeria
Medalists at the 1997 Summer Universiade
People from Umuahia
20th-century Nigerian people